Romig may refer to:

 Joe Romig (born 1941), American football player
 Joseph H. Romig (1872-1951), frontier physician in Alaska and Moravian Church missionary
 Romig Middle School, Anchorage School District
 Walter Romig (1903-1977), American author and publisher
 Joseph V. Romig (1889-1923-12-09), Inventor
 Aleatha Romig, bestselling author (NYT, WSJ) who lives in Indiana